Setopus is a genus of gastrotrichs belonging to the family Dasydytidae.

Species:

Setopus abarbita 
Setopus aequatorialis 
Setopus bisetosus 
Setopus chatticus 
Setopus dubius 
Setopus iunctus 
Setopus lemnicola 
Setopus primus 
Setopus tongiorgii

References

Gastrotricha